The Berliner Landespokal is an annual football cup competition held by the Berlin Football Association (German: Berliner Fußballverband, BFV). The cup winner qualifies for the national DFB-Pokal. Cup finals are usually held in the Friedrich-Ludwig-Jahn-Sportpark. The competition has been held since 1906, with various interruptions. Record winners are Tennis Borussia Berlin with a total of 16 titles. It is one of the 21 regional cup competitions in Germany.

Mode
All BFV teams that compete in regular leagues are eligible, as well as the winner of the "Freizeitpokal" (a competition for recreational football teams). Teams competing in the Fußball-Bundesliga and the 2. Fußball-Bundesliga are not allowed to compete. Starting with the 2007–08 season, only the first teams of every club may compete in the cup. There is a separate cup competition for the reserve teams.

The competition is held in a knock-out tournament format, with each round consisting of a single match. If scores are level, extra time will be played, and a penalty shootout follows, if necessary. Home field advantage is determined by the draw, clubs share the revenue from the match. In the final, revenue is shared equally between the finalists and the Berlin FA.

1906–1950: Berlin and Brandenburg Cup

History
Until 1931 the cup was played as "Berliner Verbandspokal" (Berlin Association Cup) in the Berlin-Brandenburg area. From 1932 to 1942 it was not held, because the national Tschammerpokal was introduced. Beginning with the 1943 edition it was re-introduced as the "Gaupokal Berlin-Brandenburg", its winner qualifying for the national cup competition. In the 1943–44 season, the Gaupokal was held, but the DFB-Pokal could not be held due to the Second World War. After the war ended and Berlin was divided in four sectors, the cup was held as "Pokal des amerikanischen Drahtfunks" (Cup of American Wire Radio) from 1946 to 1947, later renamed "RIAS-Pokal". Little had changed, with the notable exception that no Brandenburg clubs participated. From 1950, East Berlin clubs were no longer allowed to participate, they were incorporated into the East German football league system.

In the early years, the cup was dominated mostly by BFC Viktoria 1889 (initially under the name BTuFC Viktoria 1889). They managed to win the cup 5 times. But today's Bundesliga side Hertha BSC Berlin were able to capture the trophy five times as well.

Final results

1950–1991: West Berlin Cup

History
With the creation of the West German and East German states in 1949 and the subsequent introduction of the DDR-Oberliga and the FDGB-Pokal a lot changed for the Berlin Cup. Beginning with the 1950–51 season, East Berlin teams had to participate in the GDR competitions and the Berlin Cup was held for West Berlin teams only.

From 1950 to 1970 the cup was held under the name "Karl-Heinz-Schulz-Pokal". Schulz was a sports journalist and coach. Among other things he had coached the German rowing eight at the 1936 Olympic Games. Aged 39, he died after complications following surgery.

In 1969 there was no cup winner, as the penalty shootout was not yet introduced and Hertha 03 Zehlendorf took their traditional world tour immediately after the match, so a replay match could not be scheduled.

In 1970 the cup was renamed "Paul-Rusch-Pokal". Paul Rusch had been made first president of the Berlin FA in 1949. He held that position until 1970. All non-professional sides that participated in the regular league competitions held by the Berlin FA. Since the 1957–58 season, the cup winner has qualified for the national cup competition, the DFB-Pokal.

Final results

1992 until today: Berlin Cup for all of Berlin

History
After German reunification in 1990 football competition in East and West Berlin were unified in the 1991–92 season. Since then only two teams from the former East Berlin has been able to win the cup. 1. FC Union Berlin won the cup in 1994 and 2007. BFC Dynamo won the cup for the first time 1999 and has gone on to win the cup at more several times. Other teams from former East Berlin has been finalists, such as Köpenicker SC in 2007 and SV Lichtenberg 47  in 2013 and 2016. Köpenicker SC was founded in 1991 and thus never participated in the East German football league system, but is considered the successor of BSG Motor Köpenick. 

The Paul Rusch Cup rarely attracted more than regional interest. But in 1992–93 the reserve of Hertha BSC attracted national interest when they reached the DFB-Pokal final after winning the Berlin Cup. In the final the team lost to Bayer Leverkusen. In 2001 two teams formed by immigrants faced each other for the first time in a German Regional Cup final. The Turkish derby between SV Yeşilyurt Berlin and Türkiyemspor Berlin generated international media interest and created for the first live broadcast of the Berlin Cup final by Turkish TV channel TRT-int.

In 2004 the competition was renamed again, bearing the name "ODDSET-Cup" until 2006. After a court decision this name could no longer be used and so the cup was held under the name "BFV-Pokal – unter der Schirmherrschaft von Lotto Berlin" (BFV-Cup – under the patronage of Lotto Berlin) or short "BFV-Pokal" (BFC-Cup), before it was renamed "Berliner-Pilsner-Pokal" (after a brand of beer) in 2007.

Final results
The respective league the teams competed in is referenced in brackets behind the team name:
 3L: 3. Liga (since 2008)
 RL: Regionalliga Nordost (1994 until 2000) or Regionalliga Nord (since 2000)
 OL: NOFV-Oberliga Mitte (1991 until 1994) or NOFV-Oberliga Nord (since 1992)
 VL: Verbandsliga Berlin (Berlin-Liga)
 LL: Landesliga Berlin

Winners

References

External links
Current Berlin Cup news
Berlin Cup final results

Football cup competitions in Germany
Football competitions in Berlin
Recurring sporting events established in 1906
1906 establishments in Germany